Michele Mancini Parri (born 13 May 1998, in Arezzo) is an Italian rugby union player.
His usual position is as a prop and he currently plays for Fiamme Oro in Top10.

Under contract with Petrarca Padova in Top12 until 2021−2022 season, for 2019–20 Pro14 season, he named as Permit Player for Benetton.

In 2017 and 2018, Mancini Parri was named in the Italy Under 20 squad.

References

External links 
It's Rugby France profile
Ultimate Rugby profile

1998 births
Living people
Italian rugby union players
Rugby union props